Trachyspic acid is a fungal isolate that can inhibit heparanase.

References

Tricarboxylic acids
Spiro compounds